Wanghe Bridge is an overpass and a nodal point in Beijing.

When it was first built it carried  a railway line over the northeastern 4th Ring Road. This railway line ran from the now disused Hepingli Railway Station.

Wanghe Bridge was expanded in the early 2000s to let the CityRail (Line 13 (Beijing Subway) through. The tracks of the CityRail essentially replaced those of the former railway line. A further expansion in 2002 created the bridge that is seen today.

The bridge was, until September 28, 2004, the starting point of the Jingcheng Expressway to Laiguangying and ultimately Chengde in Hebei province. The expressway now commences at Taiyanggong on the 3rd Ring Road. The expressway bridges are right over the 4th Ring Road, which runs under the bridge.

Wanghe Bridge comprises three layers. The first layer is an underpass for vehicles on the 4th Ring Road. The second layer is the Jingcheng Expressway running over the 4th Ring Road. Finally, a few flyover bridges -- connection lines -- form a more irregular third layer.

Traffic at Wanghe Bridge is usually smooth.

References

Bridges in Beijing
Road-rail bridges